Frank Verleyen (born 26 February 1963) is a Belgian former cyclist. He competed in the individual road race event at the 1984 Summer Olympics.

References

External links
 

1963 births
Living people
Belgian male cyclists
Olympic cyclists of Belgium
Cyclists at the 1984 Summer Olympics
Cyclists from Antwerp